The Cincinnati Revolution was a professional ultimate disc team, based in Cincinnati, Ohio, which competed in the American Ultimate Disc League (AUDL). It was one of the eight charter teams in the AUDL, having competed in the league's Midwestern Conference since its inception in 2012. Originally based in Lexington, Kentucky, and playing as the Bluegrass Revolution, the Cincinnati Revolution moved to Cincinnati before the 2013 season. They played their home games at Sheakley Athletic Center, at the University of Cincinnati. As The Bluegrass Revolution, they played at Henry Clay High School in Lexington KY.

The Revolution made the AUDL playoffs once, in 2012, while playing as the Bluegrass Revolution. Its team colors were black and green, and its logo was a fleur-de-lis.

Franchise History 

With the growing popularity of the sport of ultimate, the AUDL was formed in 2012 by Josh Moore, with eight teams in the East Coast and in the Midwest. One of the AUDL's inaugural franchises, the Bluegrass Revolution, was based in Kentucky, playing its home games in Lexington, at Henry Clay High School's Jack Bell Stadium.

2012 season 

In its first year, the Bluegrass Revolution was composed of ultimate disc players from Kentucky and the surrounding area. After starting the 2012 season 3-0, with wins over Western Division rivals, the Indianapolis AlleyCats, Columbus Cranes, and the Detroit Mechanix, the Bluegrass Revolution finished second in the Western Division with a record of 9-7, behind the AlleyCats. In the 2012 AUDL playoffs, the Revolution played against the AlleyCats for the Western Division title, but lost by the score of 24-20.

2013 season 

After the 2012 season, the Bluegrass Revolution relocated from Lexington to Cincinnati, Ohio. Despite the Bluegrass Revolution's strong play and playoff berth in 2012, attendance at the Revolution's home games in Lexington, KY, was lackluster throughout the year. The Revolution's relocation was also influenced by the folding of the AULD's franchise in Columbus, Ohio, the Columbus Cranes. Other factors involved in the move northward was Cincinnati's youth ultimate scene, which is one of the largest and most successful in the country, with one of the top high school teams in the nation, and the strong culture of the sport of ultimate in the area. Additionally, the Revolution were able to play its home games at the University of Cincinnati's Sheakley Athletic Center, which is regarded as one of the top stadiums in the league.

Despite its 9-7 record in 2012, the Cincinnati Revolution entered the 2013 season as an underdog. “Everybody has already said that Madison or Chicago is going to win our division,” Raymie Younkin, the Revolution's General Manager, admitted before the season began. However, he disagreed with the previews, which had the Revolution ranked fifth in the six-team Midwestern Division. He stressed the Revolution's focus on team-chemistry over star players, claiming that “teamwork is our big thing. We know that we don’t have the names like Brodie Smith and Goose Helton [of the Windy City Wildfire]. But that’s not who we are.”

Nevertheless, it was Smith, Helton, and fellow Wildfire star A.J. Nelson that put on a clinic to hand the Revolution a steep 26-15 defeat in their season opener in front of the home crowd. A similar loss to the Wildfire, a tight victory against the Wind Chill, in which the Revolution fought off a vicious comeback attempt, and a sloppy loss to the Detroit Mechanix in difficult weather conditions left the Revolution at 1-3 and in last place in the Midwestern Division after four weeks of play. Continued strong play from handler Chris “Fudge” Powers, and deep cutter Isaac Jeffries, however, gave the Revolution back-to-back victories over the Mechanix, bringing them back to .500 and moving them up to the third in the division and fourth in the season's power rankings. However, the Revolution dropped three straight games against their division rivals, the Indianapolis AlleyCats, and then lost its next two matches, against the Minnesota Wind Chill and the Madison Radicals, to fall to 3-8. A 23-21 win in a daunting matchup against the Madison Radicals kept the Revolution's playoff hopes alive, but another bad loss to the Wind Chill in week 12 eliminated them from playoff contention. The Revolution's inability to consistently beat teams of lesser or equal caliber in their division resulted in a 4-12 finish for their 2013 campaign, leaving them in last place in the Midwestern Division.

Despite the disappointing finish, the Revolution's roster included several of the AUDL's top performers, such as Powers, who lead the league with 74 assists and made the All AUDL First Team, Jeffries, who, together with Ryan Gorman, tied for the team lead with 36 goals, and Mark Fedorenko, who established himself as a solid deep defender with a team-leading 29 blocks.

2014 season 

After only returning four members of their 2012 roster for the 2013 season, the Revolution's 2014 squad boasted many of their top players from years past, including Jeffries, Powers, and defensive captain Kevin Kula. In addition to retaining their core group from 2013, the Revolution also brought back several of its key players from its 2012 playoff run, including Kentucky natives Ben Blatz and Ben Sever. The Revolution also drew players from their rival Indianapolis AlleyCats’ roster, including defensive handler Mike Ford, and offensive Mike Ames. Other additions to the roster included Patrick Kaufmann, from the University of Dayton, and players from area club teams, like Columbus Madcow's Phil Cherosky, Dayton Enigma's Matt Muhlenkamp, and Cincinnati Steamboat's Joe Mozloom. However, the roster was also without several key pieces from 2013, such as offensive Ryan Gorman, and versatile players like Ben Sage and Ryan Sitler. The remaining roster spots were filled by players who competed for a place on the team in a combination of open and closed tryouts and practices beginning on November 9.

After a series of scrimmages against the Indianapolis AlleyCats, the Revolution opened their 2014 campaign at home against last year's Midwest Champion Madison Radicals. Despite a strong first quarter, which ended with the Revolution in a commanding 5-3 lead, Cincinnati faltered in the second and third periods, and the game ended with a 25-16 loss to open the season.

The Revolution collected their first win of the 2014 season the next week, however, beating the heavily favored Chicago Wildfire in Cincinnati by a score of 23-22. In what was arguably the biggest upset in franchise history, Revolution relied on Nate Botti throughout the game, as he collected 8 assists and 5 goals, staving off an impressive offensive performance by the Wildfire's A.J. Nelson, who caught 11 goals in the game. Botti would go on to have a breakout year for the Revolution, leading the team with 47 assists, while placing second on the team with 19 goals, one behind team leader Matt Muhlenkamp.

The Revolution sat at 3-2 after the 5th week of the season, but proceeded to lose their next 8 games, falling out of playoff contention after losing a tight game to the AlleyCats in Indianapolis, 23-22. A final victory over the Detroit Mechanix ended the Revolution's 2014 season at 4-10, good for 5th place in the AUDL's Midwestern Conference.

Despite the poor final season record, the Revolution saw improvement from young players, such as Alan Huels, who developed into one of the league's best pullers and deep defenders, and Nick"High school"Bissonnette, who graduated from high school in May 2014, but ended up playing 88 points for the Revolution over the course of the season. The Revolution was also the first team in professional ultimate disc to use a GoPro camera to record video from a radio-controlled helicopter during games.

References

External links 
 AUDL Website
 Cincinnati Revolution Homepage

Ultimate (sport) teams
Ultimate teams established in 2012
Sports teams in Cincinnati
2012 establishments in Ohio
Ultimate teams disestablished in 2016
2016 disestablishments in Ohio